Potted History: The Story of Plants in the Home  is a 2007 book on the social history and horticulture of houseplants by the journalist Catherine Horwood. It was first published in hardback by the British publisher Frances Lincoln Publishers.

Editions
Potted History: The Story of Plants in the Home was published in an illustrated, hardback edition.

Summary
Rather than focusing on the more usual subject matter of how to look after and rear houseplants, Horwood instead traces the historical and sociological reasons why houseplants came to be found in our homes. She writes how potted plants and domestic horticulture are as subject to fashion as pieces of furniture, from the Victorian's use of the aspidistra in their front parlour to the contemporary of the orchid in the designer loft. The book also covers the influence of indoor horticulture on period design, finding that Wedgwood created a market for special bulb pots and that some of Terence Conran's early designs were for houseplant containers.

External links
 Catherine Horwood 
 Amazon Books Biography 
 Telegraph Author Interview

References

2007 non-fiction books
Social history
Gardening books
Interior design